Nitin Sahrawat (Born 13 August 1981), is an Indian actor, a social activist, and the Editor in Chief of Atal Indians Magazine. Sahrawat is the creator of Atal Indian Project, which aims at creating multiple Urban forest named Atal Vatika, in cities and towns of India. He is the Managing Director of QuiteLit Digital.

Early life and education
Sahrawat was born in a family of academicians, with his mother being a professor and his father an attorney, and did his schooling from Brightlands School and St. Joseph's Academy, Dehradun. 
Subsequently, he pursued Mechanical Engineering at Bapuji Institute of Engineering & Technology, Davangere, Karnataka. Sahrawat opted out of the degree after first year, citing disillusionment with the Indian education system as the primary reason; and left for Mumbai to pursue a career in modeling and acting.

Career

Modelling
Nitin started his modelling career in 2002 with a print campaign for Standard Chartered and in the following years he went on to become one of the most visible faces on Indian television, with TV commercials for brands including Tide, Pillsbury Company, Maruti 800, Hyundai Santro, LG Electronics, Hero MotoCorp, Ariel, Tropicana Products and Sunsilk. As a result of Indian economy opening up in 1990s (1990s in India) international brands started devising strategies of entering the lucrative Indian market. Nitin Sahrawat was the face of many such launches in India, including his commercial for Pedigree Petfoods, Nokia N72 and Tetley.

In 2004 Samsung rolled out a big budget campaign to commemorate Indian cricket team's tour of Pakistan, which was one of the biggest sporting event of the Indian subcontinent as the two nations had resumed sporting ties after a long gap. Sahrawat acted in this campaign which was named "Jeet Lo Dil" (Win Hearts). As a result of this campaign he became popular in Pakistan too, and in spite of Pakistan Government's official ban on using Indian actors for Pakistani ad campaigns, he later went on to act in numerous Pakistani TV commercials.

His TV commercial for Indian Oil Corporation won the IDPA (Indian Documentary Producers' Association) and RAPA (Radio & TV Advertising Practitioners Association of India) Awards in 2005. In 2010 Cannes Lions winner director duo Nic Osborne and Sune Maroni directed a Fiat Punto TV commercial starring Nitin Sahrawat which went on to win numerous awards including Creative ABBY 2011 and Adfest 2011. Other acclaimed directors who have often worked with Sahrawat include Pradeep Sarkar, Shantanu Bagchi, Oni Sen, Arjun Mukherjee, Manav Menon, Aniket Shirke, Prahlad Kakkar, Ram Madhvani, Abhinay Deo, V. K. Prakash, E. Nivas, Pankaj Parashar and Abhijit Chaudhuri (Dadu).

Acting
In 2010, Sahrawat acted in Rann, which was directed by Ram Gopal Varma and co starred Amitabh Bachchan. After his two-movie contract with Sarvodaya Visuals got delayed, Sahrawat accepted Balaji Telefilms's offer for season two of their popular show Kitani Mohabbat Hai. He enacted the character of Rajveer Singh Ahluwalia, a stoic police officer which was quite different from the amiable characters that he had usually portrayed in his TV commercials. Kitani Mohabbat Hai Season 2 ended in May 2011 with Rajveer getting shot while trying to save Arohi.

In the first half of 2013 Nitin Sahrawat was seen in two other Balaji Telefilms shows, namely Savdhaan India and Parichay. In Parichay he played the role of a fictitious Bollywood superstar called Aman Kumar which was inspired by real life Bollywood superstar Salman Khan. In the show Aman Kumar hires Kunal (played by Samir Soni ) to defend him in a DUI & Hit and run case which was based on Salman Khan's 2002 Bandra incident.

In the latter half of 2013 Sahrawat signed up for the award-winning show Bade Achhe Lagte Hain as the antagonist against the character of Ram Kapoor (played by Ram Kapoor). In February 2014 Sahrawat started shooting for Star Plus's new show Ishq Kills which is directed by Vikram Bhatt. In the latter half of the year Sahrawat started shooting for Saurabh Tewari's new show called Do Deewane Ek Shehar Me, but this show was scrapped by the channel before its telecast.

In 2015 Sahrawat was signed up for two shows of 4 Lions Films, namely Qubool Hai and Adhuri Kahaani Hamari (TV series). In Qubool Hai he portrayed the part of Bollywood superstar Anand Kumar while in Adhuri Kahaani Hamari (TV series) he was seen as Chote Raja Lakshman Dev and was paired opposite Shubhangi Atre Poorey. In September Sahrawat was seen in a special episode of Code Red, in which he played the character of a psychopathic killer. This episode was based on truck driver M. Jaishankar and his killing spree in southern India.

Personal life
Nitin Sahrawat was married to Indian television actress Vaishnavi Dhanraj. The two first met on the set of Nitin's show Kitani Mohabbat Hai Season 2.  After a courtship of two years Nitin and Vaishnavi got married in Shantikunj, Haridwar according to Vedic Rituals on 23 December 2012. The reception in Mumbai was attended by their co actors including Meghna Malik, Kritika Kamra, Karan Kundra, Simran Kaur, Sadiya Siddiqui, Dayanand Shetty, Khalid Siddiqui and Hrishikesh Pandey. The two stayed in Mumbai with their Labrador Retriever named Thor.

In March 2014 Nitin and Vaishnavi were the guests for the launch episode of NDTV's The Getaway in which the two were given a Hyundai Elantra which they then drove down to Kamshet. The theme of the episode being adventure ,the couple then paraglided off the challenging Shelar's site. This episode was shot at their Lokhandwala Complex home and also featured their pet.

Sahrawat and Dhanraj filed for legal separation in July 2015 and were divorced in January 2016, opting for a mutual and amicable divorce in Bandra family court. Incompatibility and emotional disconnect was cited as the reason for the end of the marriage. In December 2016, a celebrity gossip website alleged that even though the divorce was mutual, the reason for the end of the marriage was domestic violence. This version quickly went viral with mainstream news portals and publications quoting the gossip website article. None of these news articles included any quote from Sahrawat, a fact that he lamented in a social media post. This Facebook post was later published by some media outlets as a form of an apology for the unverified publications based on tabloid journalism.

Social causes
Sahrawat has conceived and implemented the Atal Indian Project, which aims at creating multiple nature reserves or urban forests called Atal Vatikas, in Indian cities. Color coordinated avenue tree plantation in the urban centers of India, is another stated mission of the project. In August 2018, the capital of the Indian state of Uttarakhand became the first city to support the Atal Indian project.

Sahrawat is also a patron of the Patriot Dogs campaign, which rehabilitates service dogs from the Indian Army, police and paramilitary forces, post their retirement from the call of duty. Over the years Sahrawat has collaborated with the government in the form of his Public Service Films and TV commercials. These include causes like Family Planning in India, Public Safety and World Heart Federation.

Atal Indian
Atal Indian is a social movement, focused on providing practical solutions to the challenges faced by the rapidly urbanizing India. It is dedicated to the 10th Prime Minister of India Atal Bihari Vajpayee according to its mission statement. Atal Indian's primary activities include ecocentric projects like Atal Vatika, aimed at betterment of the quality of life of the Indian citizens, in sync with the available natural resources around them.

It strives for the creation of 'Green' smart cities, and modifying the existing Indian population centers, with nature being the core and the unifying essence. A sustainable city which is in sync with its natural resources, provides an ideal foundation for comprehensive growth of its denizens.

History
Atal Indian was conceived by Nitin Sahrawat in 2016. In 2016, Sahrawat started a pilot project to create an urban forest, and Avenue (landscape) tree plantation in Dehradun, when he personally dug out fifty pits, and planted Gulmohar and Saraca asoca trees, protecting them with tree guards which had been granted by the city council. In two years time, this pilot project proved to be successful enough for Sahrawat to decide on replicating this project in other Indian cities. He has collaborated with the administration of the Indian state of Uttarakhand, and has pledged his support for the Rispana Rejuvenation project of the  Chief Minister Trivendra Singh Rawat.

Projects

Atal Urban Rejuvenation Project aims at inculcating landscape architecture at the local resident welfare association level in the cities and villages of India, through the participation of the local population. It aims at better coordination between the RWAs and the administrative bodies, for providing a uniform look to the entire city, brought about by colour coordinated Avenue tree plantation drives, covering the entire city.

An integral part of this project is the waterfront development of the Urban riverside, and creation of greenways. Nature can be used to provide important services for communities by protecting them against flooding or excessive heat, or helping to improve air, soil and water quality. More green space around one's house is associated with better mental health. Also, an availability of green space in neighbourhoods helps the senior citizen segment of the population by encouraging increased physical activity, which results in healthier and longer lifespans.

Advertising campaigns

Television

Films

References

External links
 
 

1981 births
Male actors from Dehradun
Indian male models
Indian male television actors
Living people